Joshi Loden Marshall is a jazz saxophonist, born in Berkeley, California in 1971. In the 1990s he played with the Marshall Arts Trio of which his father Fred Marshall (1938–2001) was also a member. In 1995 he joined Mingus Amungus, a band that drew its inspiration from the composer and bassist Charlie Mingus, and has latterly developed his own Joshi Marshall Project.

Marshall's mother is the singer Beverly Bivens, a member of the rock group We Five in the mid-1960s.

References

1971 births
Living people